Tamu may refer to:
 Texas A&M University or TAMU
 Tamu, Myanmar
 Tamu District, Myanmar
 Tamu Township
 Ta'mu, rice cooked in woven coconut leaves from the Philippines
 Tamu Massif, an inactive underwater volcano in the Pacific
 Heliophorus tamu, a butterfly of family Lycaenidae
 Tamu people or Gurung, an ethnic group of Nepal
 Tamu (bivalve), a mollusk genus of the family Mytilidae
 Tamu, a lioness in the 2006 series of Big Cat Diary

People with the surname
 Bwana Tamu (fl. 1713), Kenyan sultan

See also
 Tampere United or TamU-K, a Finnish football club
 Tamu Kyi, an alternative name for the Gurung language
Tamus, a genus of flowering plants